Toto (1931–1968) (a.k.a. M'Toto meaning "Little Child" in Swahili)  was a gorilla that was adopted and raised very much like a human child.

A. Maria Hoyt adopted the baby female gorilla orphaned by a hunt in French Equatorial Africa in 1931.  Mrs. Hoyt's husband killed the baby gorilla's father for a museum piece, and his guides killed its mother for fun. Mrs. Hoyt moved to Cuba to provide a more tropical home for Toto.  At the age of four or five, Toto adopted a kitten named Principe, carrying the kitten with her everywhere.  When Toto became too difficult to manage for a private keeper, she was leased to the Ringling Brothers and Barnum and Bailey Circus as a potential mate for another gorilla, Gargantua, a.k.a. Buddy.  Toto died in 1968. Toto is buried at "Sandy Lane" Kennels Pet Cemetery in Sarasota, Florida.

See also
 List of individual apes

References

Further reading
Toto and I: A Gorilla in the Family (1941) by A. Maria Hoyt
Eve & the Apes (1988) by Emily Hahn
Gorilla (Jan 27th 1941) Life Magazine

Individual gorillas
Circus apes
1931 animal births
1968 animal deaths
Individual primates in the United States